Colaba Railway Station was a railway station on the Bombay, Baroda and Central India Railway (BB&CI) located in Colaba in then South Bombay (now South Mumbai.) 

The original BBCI terminus was at Grant Road. This was subsequently extended to Churchgate in 1870 and to Colaba, at the southern tip of the island, in 1873. However, by the 1920s, the Government of Bombay ordered the Railway to hand over the section between Churchgate and Colaba to facilitate the development of Backbay Reclamation project, now Nariman Point. After the new Bombay Central station was opened in 1930, the line between Churchgate and Colaba was closed and removed.

References

External links
Time line of Indian Railways
Colaba Station
https://wr.indianrailways.gov.in/cris/uploads/files/1392817958306-article2.pdf

Defunct railway stations in Mumbai